The Roadhouse Blues Tour was a 1970 tour undertaken by rock band the Doors. The group recorded many of the concerts which have been subsequently released through Elektra Records, Rhino Records and Bright Midnight Records.

Background
Following the Doors' controversial concert in Miami, Florida, where lead singer Jim Morrison performed while he was intoxicated, the band started touring to promote their upcoming album, Morrison Hotel. The tour began in June 1970, and ended in August of the same year.

The Doors played 24 dates in the United States and Canada throughout the first half of 1970. One of the tour's concerts was performed in Felt Forum, which marked the start of the tour as well. Some of these recordings were later captured on the live album Absolutely Live. One performance of that concert included a extended version of "The End" in which Morrison incorporated a line "Bring out your dead".

The tour's last concert was performed in Isle of Wight Festival on August 29. The band played alongside Jimi Hendrix, the Who, Joni Mitchell, Jethro Tull, Taste, Leonard Cohen, Miles Davis, Emerson, Lake & Palmer and Sly and the Family Stone. Two of their songs from the show were featured in the 1995 documentary Message to Love.

Tour Dates
Per sources:

References

The Doors